Gohrisch is a municipality in the Sächsische Schweiz-Osterzgebirge district, in Saxony, Germany.

Geography

History

References 

Populated places in Saxon Switzerland